Veshmeh Sara (also Romanized as Veshmeh Sarā) is a village in Howmeh Rural District, in the Central District of Masal County, Gilan Province, Iran. At the 2006 census, its population was 1,213, in 308 families.

References 

Populated places in Masal County